Wildest Dreams is an album released in 1999 by American country music singer John Berry. It was his only release for the Lyric Street Records label, and his first release after exiting Capitol Nashville in 1998. The album includes the singles "Love Is for Giving" and "Power Windows," both of which charted on Hot Country Songs. Mark Spiro produced the album.

History
Following the release of his 1996 album Faces, Berry recorded two unreleased albums for his previous label, Capitol Nashville. The first of these, Crazy for the Girl, was to have been released in 1997, but its lead-off single "The Stone" was withdrawn after Berry suffered vocal cord problems. A second, Better Than a Biscuit, was given a release date of 1998, but also went unreleased due to Berry's decision to exit the label. Both of these albums produced low-charting singles: "The Stone" from the former, and "Over My Shoulder" and "Better Than a Biscuit" from the latter.

Wildest Dreams produced two singles for Barry on the Hot Country Songs charts: "Love Is for Giving" peaked at #53, and "Power Windows" (a cover of the Billy Falcon song) at #43. Also included are covers of John Farnham's "You're the Voice" and Phil Collins's "You'll Be in My Heart."

Critical reception
Charlotte Dillon of Allmusic rated the album four stars out of five, saying that its sound was closer to soft rock than country music, but praising Berry's voice and calling it a "powerful match" to the songs.

Track listing
"Love Is for Giving" (Robert Ellis Orrall, David Tyson) – 4:57
"Rescued Me" (Marc-Alan Barnett, D. Vincent Williams) – 4:20
"Love Was Made for Us" (Michael Lunn, Jeff Silbar) – 4:22
"Salvation" (Gary Burr) – 4:03
"Where Would I Be" (Rick Bowles, Jeff Hanna, Josh Leo) – 3:49
"Power Windows" (Billy Falcon) – 4:14
"Until I'm Loving You" (Jack Blades, Burr, Soraya) – 3:24
"Rivers in the Clouds" (Lunn) – 3:24
"You'll Be in My Heart" (Phil Collins) – 3:31
"You're the Voice" (Andy Qunta, Keith Reid, Maggie Ryder, Chris Thompson) – 4:18
"The One You Love" (Stephony Smith, Jeff Wood) – 3:46

Personnel
 Eddie Bayers - drums
 John Berry - lead vocals
 Mike Brignardello - bass guitar
 Larry Byrom - acoustic guitar
 Eric Darken - percussion
 Dan Dugmore - steel guitar
 Larry Franklin - fiddle
 Paul Franklin - steel guitar
 Sonny Garrish - steel guitar
 John Hobbs - keyboards, piano
 Bobby Huff - drum loops
 Dann Huff - electric guitar
 Jeff King - electric guitar
 Greg Morrow - drums
 Steve Nathan - synthesizer strings
 Amanda Omartian - background vocals
 Mark Spiro - background vocals
 Kara Williamson - background vocals

Chart performance

References

1999 albums
John Berry (country singer) albums
Lyric Street Records albums